The 1987 Washington Commandos season was the first season for the Commandos.

The Commandos had the honor of playing in the first AFL regular season game on June 19, 1987, losing to the Pittsburgh Gladiators 46-48 at the Civic Arena. The Commandos picked up their first win in franchise history the following week, when they defeated the Denver Dynamite, by a score of 36-20 in their home opener. The Commandos finished the season with a 2-4 record, a disappointment, but the team was in every game except one, losing 3 games by a total of 6 points.

Regular season

Schedule

Standings

y – clinched regular-season title

x – clinched playoff spot

Roster

Stats

Offense

Quarterback

Running backs

Wide receivers

Defense

Special teams

Kick return

Kicking

All-Arena team members

References

Washington Commandos
Washington Commandos
Washington Commandos seasons